Michael John Smith (born March 28, 1972) is an American retired professional basketball player. Nicknamed "The Animal", he played in seven seasons from 1994–2001 in the National Basketball Association (NBA).

A 6'8" power forward from Providence College, Smith was selected by the Sacramento Kings in the second round of the 1994 NBA Draft. He would play for the Kings, Vancouver Grizzlies, and Washington Wizards, tallying 2,527 NBA career points and 3,193 NBA career rebounds. He also played with the Indiana Pacers during the 2003 preseason.

On November 10, 1995, as a member of the Kings, Smith was involved in a physical altercation with Indiana Pacers forward Dale Davis. All bench players from both teams left their benches, and were automatically fined $2,500 and suspended for one game for leaving the bench. Smith and Davis were both fined $20,000 and suspended for two games.

During his time with the Washington Wizards, he was a teammate of an unrelated player named Mike Smith.

References

External links

1972 births
Living people
African-American basketball players
American expatriate basketball people in Canada
American expatriate basketball people in Italy
American men's basketball players
Basketball players from Washington, D.C.
Dakota Wizards (CBA) players
Dunbar High School (Washington, D.C.) alumni
Idaho Stampede (CBA) players
Parade High School All-Americans (boys' basketball)
Power forwards (basketball)
Providence Friars men's basketball players
Sacramento Kings draft picks
Sacramento Kings players
Vancouver Grizzlies players
Washington Wizards players
21st-century African-American sportspeople
20th-century African-American sportspeople